The 2004 Arab Youth Athletics Championships was the inaugural edition of the international athletics competition for under-18 athletes from Arab countries. Organised by the Arab Athletic Federation, it took place in Rabat, Morocco from 31 July to 2 August. A total of thirty-nine events were contested, of which 20 by male and 19 by female athletes, identically matching the programme of the 2003 World Youth Championships in Athletics. The girls' programme did not have a steeplechase event.

Five athletes completed individual doubles at the tournament. On the boys' side, Omani Abdullah Al-Sooli won a 100 metres/200 metres short sprint double and Abdalaati Iguider of Morocco took both middle-distance titles. On the girls' side, Nawal El Jack of Sudan won both the 400 metres flat and 400 metres hurdles, Jordan's Rima Taha won both horizontal jumps, and Egypt's Sara Es Sayed Hassib Dardiri won the shot put and discus throw.

The host nation Morocco easily topped the table with a total of fourteen golds among its 42 medals. The Next most successful nations were Egypt, with six gold medals, and Sudan, with five gold medals from its haul of 17. Saudi Arabia and Algeria were the other stand-out nations, having each won thirteen medals. A total of twelve nations reached the medal table.

The competition was held in the same year as the 2004 Arab Junior Athletics Championships. The youth event subsequently became a biennial event held in odd-numbered years, in order to avoid the schedule clash. Three champions from the youth championships also won an Arab junior title that year, all from the throw events: Mostafa Abdul El-Moaty won the shot put titles, Yasser Mohamed Ali Hassan had a javelin throw double, and Iman Mohamed El Ashri was twice hammer throw winner. Four of the medallists here went on to win individual medals at the 2005 World Youth Championships in Athletics: Adam El-Nour turned his Arab youth 400 m to a world gold, Nawal El Jack won the girls' 400 m world title, while Arab boy's 400 m hurdles medallists Abdulagadir Idriss and Mohammed Daak were first and second at the global event.

Medal summary

Men

Women

Medal table

References

Results
Pan Arab Youth Championships. GBR Athletics. Retrieved on 2015-05-25.

Arab Youth Athletics Championships
Sport in Rabat
Arab Youth Athletics Championships
Arab Youth Athletics Championships
International athletics competitions hosted by Morocco
2004 in youth sport
21st century in Rabat
July 2004 sports events in Africa
August 2004 sports events in Africa